Diego de Brea (born 1969 in Šempeter pri Gorici) is a Slovenian theatre director.

Life and work

Diego de Brea finished elementary school and high school in Nova Gorica and then studied comparative literature and art history at the Faculty of Arts in Ljubljana. In 1995, he started studying theatre direction the Academy for Theatre, Radio, Film and Television in Ljubljana.

In 1999, his graduation piece, The Birth of Light, won an award at the International Student Production Theatre Festival in  Brno. He has authored a number of well-known performances in Slovenian repertory and non-institutional theatres. He tackles many genres ranging from youth pieces and puppet shows (even a puppet opera), to self-authored projects, classical and contemporary texts as well as musical vaudeville. In  Italy, he directed a self-authored project Leonora, starring the opera singer Eleonora Jankovich and based on Wagner’s motifs.

His performances toured both in Slovenia and abroad - in Belgrade, at the Varna Festival in Bulgaria, at the Mladi levi and Exodos Festivals, in London, Paris, Antwerp, Mons, Dortmund and at the Iberoamericano Festival in Bogotá, Colombia.

Honours, awards and recognitions

His self-authored project Duel (Glej Theatre, Ljubljana), received a special award at the Borštnik Drama Meeting. In 2005, de Brea received the aesthetic breakthrough award at the same festival for his performances Queen Margot and Edward II. He also received the Golden Bird Award for theatre in 2002.

Major works

 Pilot – hommage to Srečko Kosovel, AGRFT, 1996/7
 Federico – poetry by Federico García Lorca, MGL, 1999
 Oton Župančič: Veronika of Desenice, Šentjakobsko Theatre, 2000
 Eugène Ionesco: Exit the King, PDG Drama Theatre Nova Gorica, 2000
 Bob Fosse: Chicago, SGL Celje, 2002
 Duel, GLEJ Theatre, 2002
 Roland Schimmelpfenning: Arabian Night, SNG Nova Gorica, 2005
 Alfred de Vigny: Chatterton, Slovene National Theatre (SNG) Drama Ljubljana, 2004
 Ivan Cankar: A Scandal in Saint Florian's Valley, SNG Nova Gorica, 2005
 Alexandre Dumas: Queen Margot, Mladinsko theatre, Ljubljana, 2005
 Christopher Marlowe: Edward II, SNG Drama Ljubljana, 2005
 Christopher Marlowe: Doctor Faustus, SNG Nova Gorica, 2006
 Luchino Visconti: The Damned, Mladinsko Theatre, Ljubljana, 2006
 Jean Genet: The Maids, SNG Drama Ljubljana, 2007
 William Shakespeare, King Lear

External links 
/ Mladinsko Theatre
/ Visconti's The Damned in Sarajevo

1969 births
Slovenian theatre directors
People from Nova Gorica
Living people
University of Ljubljana alumni